Sitaramayya, Sitaramaiah, Seetharamaiah or Sita Ramayya (Telugu: సీతారామయ్య) is an Indian given name. Notable persons with that name include:

 Seetharamaiah, the main character in the 1991 Telugu film Seetharamaiah Gari Manavaralu
 Siddaramaiah (born 1948), Karnataka politician
 Bhogaraju Pattabhi Sitaramayya, Indian independence activist and political leader of Andhra Pradesh
 Kondapalli Seetharamaiah, communist leader from Andhra Pradesh
 M. V. Seetharamiah, a Kannada scholar and writer
 V. Seetharamaiah - Kannada Poet, Writer, Editor and Teacher at University of Mysore

Indian masculine given names